The 1968 Tour de Romandie was the 22nd edition of the Tour de Romandie cycle race and was held from 9 May to 12 May 1968. The race started and finished in Geneva. The race was won by Eddy Merckx.

General classification

References

1968
Tour de Romandie
May 1968 sports events in Europe